Sukjeongmun  (also known as North Gate)  is one of the Eight Gates of Seoul in the Fortress Wall of Seoul, South Korea, which surrounded the city in the Joseon Dynasty. The gate is also known as Bukdaemun (“North Big Gate”). It was built north of Seoul behind Gyeongbokgung Place. It was rarely used. It was only used in ceremonious and symbolic functions. In order to visit, identification such as a passport is required for access.

History

Sukjeongmun was originally built in 1396, and was originally called Sukcheongmun (肅淸門), but its name was modified slightly to its current name (肅靖門) in the early 16th century. Being situated so close to the Royal Palace  of the Joseon Dynasty, it was rarely used for receiving visitors, and had more of a ceremonious function. The original wooden gatehouse over the gate was destroyed by fire, and the current gatehouse dates from 1976.

The name Sukjeongmun means literally “Rule Solemnly Gate.” It is one of the Four Great Gates (사대문) in the Fortress Wall of Seoul.

The Gate today

After the infiltration of North Korean agents during the Blue House Raid in 1968, both the gate and the surrounding area were closed off for security reasons. They were opened again for public touring by 2007. However, the area is still a highly secured area, patrolled by South Korean Army soldiers. Visiting Sukjeongmun today (2012) requires identification and issuing of a pass. Pictures of army soldiers or pictures facing south (toward the Presidential residence) are not allowed at the gate or while hiking along the northern portion of the Fortress Wall.

Image gallery

References 

Buildings and structures completed in 1396
Gates in Korea
Gates in South Korea
Buildings and structures in Seoul
History of Seoul